Jaime Clarke is an American novelist and editor.  He is a founding editor of the literary journal Post Road and co-owner, with his wife, of Newtonville Books, an independent bookstore in Boston.

Early life and education
Clarke was born in Kalispell, Montana, but grew up in Phoenix, Arizona. Out of high school, Clarke worked as a runner for financier Charles Keating.

He attended Brophy College Preparatory and Arizona State University before graduating with a creative writing degree from the University of Arizona. He also holds an MFA in creative writing from Bennington College.

Career
After graduating, Clarke moved to New York City, where he worked at the Harold Ober Associates literary agency.

Clarke has taught creative writing at the University of Massachusetts in Boston and Emerson College.

His novels Vernon Downs, World Gone Water, and Garden Lakes are part of his Charlie Martens trilogy and is collected in a limited-edition omnibus published by Roundabout Press to celebrate the story collection Minor Characters, (New York Times New & Noteworthy selection) featuring original stories about the minor characters in the trilogy by Mona Awad, Christopher Boucher, Kenneth Calhoun, Nina de Gramont, Ben Greenman, Annie Hartnett, Owen King, Neil LaBute, J. Robert Lennon, Lauren Mechling, Shelly Oria, Stacey Richter, Joseph Salvatore, Andrea Seigel, and Daniel Torday. The collection features a foreword by Jonathan Lethem, and an introduction by Laura van den Berg.

Laura van den Berg on Clarke’s work wrote, "Jaime Clarke has been one of our foremost chroniclers of obsession since his debut novel, We’re So Famous, appeared in 2001."

He is the author of the Golden Age detective novel, The Disappearance of Swenson’s Secretary: A Harold Ober Mystery under the pseudonym J.D. West.

Bibliography

Novels

Short fiction

Essays and interviews

As editor

Non-fiction

References

Citations

Works cited

Further reading

External links
 

1971 births
Living people
21st-century American male writers
21st-century American novelists
American male novelists
Arizona State University alumni
Bennington College alumni
Emerson College faculty
Novelists from Arizona
Novelists from Massachusetts
People from Kalispell, Montana
University of Arizona alumni
University of Massachusetts Boston faculty
Writers from Montana
Writers from Phoenix, Arizona